Micah Hilton (born 2 October 1985) is a football goalkeeper in Montserrat who plays for P.C. United FC. He has made three appearances for the Montserrat national team.

Career

Club career
Hilton played for P.C. United FC in the Montserrat Championship from 2009.

International career
His first international appearance came on 10 June 2010 in a Caribbean Cup qualifying match against Saint Vincent & the Grenadines which, despite some brave keeping from Hilton, ended in a 7–0 defeat. Despite this defeat, Hilton retained his place for the match against Barbados two days later, in which he conceded a further five goals, as a result of which, he lost his place to Jermaine Sweeney.

Hilton's third international appearance came in a World Cup qualification match against Belize on 15 June 2011; this match ended in a 5–2 defeat, allowing Sweeney to reclaim his place.

References

External links
Details of matches on Caribbean Football Database

1985 births
Living people
Montserratian footballers
Association football goalkeepers
Montserrat international footballers
Place of birth missing (living people)